The Association of Persecutees of the Nazi Regime/Federation of Antifascists (German: Vereinigung der Verfolgten des Naziregimes – Bund der Antifaschistinnen und Antifaschisten) (VVN-BdA) is a German political confederation founded in 1947 and based in Berlin. The VVN-BdA, formerly the VVN, emerged from victims' associations in Germany founded by political opponents to Nazism after the Second World War and the end of the Nazi dictatorship.

During the Cold War, the VVN was the subject of political struggles between East and West Germany. In the West, the association was seen as dominated by the Communist Party (KPD); in the East, the VVN was accused of spying. In 1953, East Germany banned the VVN and founded the Committee of Antifascist Resistance Fighters in its place.

Since 2002, the association has extended to cover the whole of Germany, including camp communities of former prisoners of the concentration camps as incorporated associations. The VVN-BdA claims to be the biggest and oldest anti-fascist organization in the Federal Republic of Germany.

Purpose of the association
The VVN-BdA is characterised as an  independent organisation, with a focus of resistance against fascism and war as its defining moral principle. In West Germany, the organisation was seen as taking its lead from the Communist Party of Germany (KPD) in the 1950s, and after 1968 of being controlled from the top by German Communist Party (DKP) members. Nevertheless, the spread of membership continues to come from a wide range of political elements, including orthodox communists, members of the party Die Linke, and political independents, along with Green Party members and Social Democrats (in spite of a dissenting resolution adopted by the Social Democratic Party (SPD), which remained in force till October 25, 2010).

The VVN-BdA is a member of the Fédération Internationale des Résistants (International Federation of Resistance Fighters), along with organisations from all over Europe and from Israel.

History

Establishment of the organisation
With the end of World War II, self-help groups of former resistance fighters were founded in "anti-fascist committees", known as "Antifas", involving working class militants, in particular but not only Communists  which were banned immediately by the military administrations of each of the British and American occupation zones for being far politically left. They supported attending to 200,000 up to 250,000 former political persecutees by the social administrations instead..

By June 26, 1945, an "association of political prisoners and persecutees of the Nazi system" had been founded in Stuttgart, and in the following weeks and months, there were regional groups of ex-political prisoners and other persecuted individuals formed with the permission of the allied forces, in each of the four occupation zones. Their concern, next to providing social help for those in need, was to bring the voice of resistance, the political and moral weight of the opponents of the Nazi regime to form a new anti-fascist, democratic Germany.

The initiative for the VVN came from representatives of the labour parties, which had committees that provided direct assistance to people persecuted or victimised by the Nazis, whether political, religious, or racially based. It set out to be a multi-party organisation, an umbrella group for everyone, regardless of political affiliation, according to its manifesto in August 1946.

Representatives from all the regional organisations in the four occupied zones met in Frankfurt am Main from July 20–22, 1946 and adopted a charter for the "Society of People Persecuted by the Nazi Regime". On October 26, 1946, the first state organisations was founded in Düsseldorf,  North Rhine-Westphalia. Others soon followed.

From March 15–17, 1947, the 1st Inter-zonal States Conference of the VVN convened in Frankfurt am Main with 68 delegates from all four of the occupied zones and the city of Berlin and formed an organisation representing all of Germany, with a similarly constituted council and two co-chairmen at the helm.

On the territory of the Soviet occupation zone, the SMAD orders no. 28 from January, 28th, 1947, and no. 92 from April, 22nd, 1947 put the compensation on solid formal ground. The SMAD order no. 228 from July, 30th, 1946 nullified the judgements in political proceedings of the Nazis and therefore made judicial rehabilitations easier; later decrees on regaining the German citizenship made the returning to Germany easier for expatriated emigrants. A similar, but however hesitant development was pursued by the administrations in the western occupation zones.

The "red triangle", the sign sewn on the concentration camp uniforms of political prisoners, was adopted as the symbol for the VVN. The aim of the organisation was to support former prisoners, but the founding VVN members uniformly did not want to limit themselves to just this purpose. Having experienced terror personally, they wanted to be true to the Buchenwald Oath, to never again let fascism become a reality, "Our motto is the extermination of Nazism to its roots. Our goal is the creation of a new world of peace and freedom."

The political confrontation of the cold war affected the VVN heavily. Kurt Schumacher, leader of the SPD, declared a resolution of incompatibility (Unvereinbarkeitsbeschluss) for Social Democrats, which has been abolished on October 25, 2010. Nonetheless, many SPD members remained in the VVN. Prominent Nazi opponents, such as Eugen Kogon, who were close to the Christian Democratic Union (CDU) resigned from the VVN for political reasons. These actions led to a political narrowing of the VVN, although the organization continued to seek out all Nazi opponents and victims of persecution.

German Democratic Republic (former East Germany)
In 1949 and 1950, the Stalinist purges had repercussions in the Soviet occupation zone, later to become the German Democratic Republic (GDR), with the SED accusing leading members of the VVN of being agents of the west. At the same time, in connection with the Rudolf Slánský trial in the former Czechoslovakia, the policies of the GDR leadership began to evidence an increasing anti-semitism toward the Jewish Communists who had fled to western countries after 1933. Julius Meyer, an SED member and elected member of the People's Chamber, Hans Freund and other Jewish members of the VVN fled to West Germany in December 1952 and January 1953 because of the threat of persecution. Even Leo Zuckerman, a former state secretary and co-author of the GDR constitution, fled to the west.

Without the consultation of the VVN, the decision was made on January 15, 1953 to dissolve the organization. The VVN's publishing house was dissolved and in its place the Committee of Anti-fascist Resistance Fighters (Komitee der antifaschistischen Widerstandskämpfer) was set up. The overnight dissolution of the VVN met little opposition from within the organization itself. The Committee maintained close contact with the VVN in the Federal Republic of Germany (FRG).

In 1990, after the democratic revolution in the GDR, the Association of Former Participants of the Anti-Fascist Resistance, Persecutees and Survivors (Interessenverband ehemaliger Teilnehmer am antifaschistischen Widerstand, Verfolgter des Naziregimes und Hinterbliebener) (IVVdN) took over as successor to the Committee. In October 2002, the IVVdN merged with the West German VVN, forming one organization for all of Germany.

Federal Republic of Germany (former West Germany)
The Communists had a major influence within the organization. The organization was led by the SED and DKP till the German reunification in 1989. In 1989, all state chairmen, nearly all the main employees, as well as two-thirds of the membership of the national board and the steering committee were all members of the DKP.

The political scope during the founding years was distinctly limited by the Cold War. Compounding that, were the declaration of incompatibility by the SPD in May 1948 and the resignation of prominent Nazi adversaries Eugen Kogon, Heinz Galinski and Philipp Auerbach, which all caused the VVN to be viewed in public discourse as a "Communist front organization". Public servants risked dismissal if they remained members of the VVN, despite being survivors of Nazi terror.

The splits and resignations resulted in a numerical and political dominance of left-wing members. Former Communist Resistance fighters found in the VNN a political forum in which they could to meet legally while the KPD itself was legally banned.

A number of Bundesländer tried to ban the VVN during the 1950s. A judicial ruling forced Lower Saxony to lift its ban and in Hamburg, "VAN" was left as a "replacement" organization, but in Rhineland-Palatinate, the ban remained in effect. At the end of the 1950s, the federal government went to federal court to establish a ban against the VVN at the national level. The opening of the trial erupted into political scandal when it was revealed that the presiding judge, Senate President Prof. Dr. Werner had been an aggressive Nazi, resulting in the discontinuation of the case. The anti-communist climate continued to plague members of the VVN during the postwar era, though in sight of constitutional protection and during the 1970s, they were at times criticized by radicals.

From the outset, the VVN concerned itself with care for the victims of Nazi injustice, as well as the admonition and remembrance of the crimes of National Socialism. This included, for example, social counseling according to the federal law on compensation for victims of Nazi persecution, which came into force in 1956, but was retroactive to October 1, 1953. One section of the statute was problematic for VVN members, however. It excluded payments from anyone who advocated communism.

Since the 1960s, among the VVN's key spheres of political activity has been confrontation of old and new Nazis. The VVN has worked against SS reunions, against the National Democratic Party, and against Auschwitz denial and other forms of revisionist history.

A crucial step was the May 1971 expansion of the organization to include the "Association of Anti-fascists". This extended the possibility of membership beyond just the persecuted and their family members, to young who have felt a bond with concentration camp survivors and their legacy. The broadening of the VVN changed the organization  considerably during the 1970s and 1980s.

Attempted ban
After September 1950, government employees were prohibited from joining the VVN and the Bundesregierung tried to ban the organization itself in 1951. On August 2, 1951, the police closed the VVN offices in Frankfurt am Main. Following that, came prohibitions in the states of Hamburg and Rhineland-Palatinate. Other states did not follow suit, though in Bavaria, there was an attempt, which ended with a finding by the Administrative Court in Regensburg that the VVN was not anti-constitutional. The federal government made another attempt to ban the organization in 1959, but the Federal Administrative Court of Germany broke off the process after two hearings.

The ban was repealed in Hamburg in 1960 and in Rhineland-Palatinate in 1972.

Extension to the Federation of Anti-fascists
Members of the VVN were involved in a number of debates after the war. They fought against reinstalling old Nazis as office holders, against the reemergence of Nazi organizations, against the plan to re-arm Germany, against atomic armament and against the white-washing of German history from 1933 to 1945. Initiatives of the VVN led to the erection of memorial sites, such as the development of Dachau concentration camp into a noteworthy memorial site in the mid-1960s, a project with which VVN members were significantly involved.

In 1971, the VVN expanded itself to include the Bund der Antifaschisten (Federation of Anti-fascists). In the wake of the student protests of 1968 and the growth of the right-wing extremist National Democratic Party (NPD), many young people became interested in the debate over Germany's Nazi past. The organization was also faced with a graying and declining membership and needed to invigorate itself with newer, younger members. Key themes of the 1970s and 1980s were the peace movement and anti-fascism.

1989 crisis
In 1989, it became officially known that most of the VVN's work at the federal level was financed through funds from the GDR. With the end of this funding, came a financial crisis that brought VVN to the brink of dissolution. The full-time staff had to be laid off. According to the 1989 Verfassungsschutzbericht of Lower Saxony (page 26), until the fall of communism, all applications for full-time VVN employees had been reviewed and approved by the Chairman of the German Communist Party (DKP). The president and secretariat of the national board of the VVN-BdA resigned in January 1990. The organization then voted to continue the work with reduced means and a new organizational structure.

The absence of funding by the GDR opened the door for non-dogmatic influence; the Union became open to unaffiliated anti-fascists.

Merging the East and West German organizations
In October 2002, the West German VVN-BdA in Berlin merged with the East German Interessenverband ehemaliger Teilnehmer am antifaschistischen Widerstand, Verfolgter des Naziregimes und Hinterbliebener (Interest Group of Former Participants in the Anti-Fascist Resistance, Persecutees of the Nazi Regime, and Survivors) and the Bund der Antifaschisten (Federation of Anti-Fascists). Following the mergers, the organization's membership was around 9,000.

Representatives of domestic and foreign organizations of former persecutees, as well as guests of German organizations took part in the unification congress. Among them was Horst Schmitthenner, executive board member of IG Metall, who emphatically welcomed the VVN merger and declared, "As in the past, IG Metall will support the vital work of the VVN-BdA."

VVN today
The VVN-BdA works to fight racism, xenophobia and anti-semitism; any discrimination based on national origin, race, sexual orientation or ideology and is against physical or other threats resulting from such discrimination.

The organization has under 9,000 members (as of 2003). Twice a month, it publishes the magazine, Antifa. The honorary president is the late Kurt Julius Goldstein.

Campaign to ban neo-Nazi party

The VVN-BdA initiated a nationwide campaign in early 2007, lasting till that December, that called for a renewed effort to ban the NPD. At the heart of the campaign was a petition calling for the Bundestag to pass "a new ban against the NPD, according to Article 21, paragraph 2 of the [German] Constitution". The campaign included informational tables and events throughout Germany and had celebrity support from Hannelore Elsner, Frank Werneke and the board of 1. FC Nürnberg.

At the end of the petition campaign on December 12, 2007, the 175,455 signatures were delivered to Bundestag Vice President Petra Pau, Bundestag members Gesine Lötzsch and Dorothée Menzner of the Left Party and Niels Annen of the Social Democratic Party. A new campaign to ban the NPD began on January 27, 2009.

Assessment by German intelligence
The 2005 report on political extremism by Germany's Federal Office for the Protection of the Constitution considered the VVN-BdA as "influenced by left-wing extremism". It found that
 the "Members and former members of the DKP and traditionalist members of the Left Party-PDS still hold important positions of leadership";
 "The organisation is thus still predominantly committed to orthodox/communist "anti-fascism", which argues that right-wing extremism is inherently linked to market economy systems and that state institutions in western democracies are thus more likely to support right-wing extremist activity than fight it."
 that in this view, "a socialist/communist dictatorship is the only logical alternative to "fascist" threats".

The report acknowledged that the VVN-BdA had, since 1989, stopped describing ultra-left violence and injustice as commendable; nevertheless, Communist crimes were consistently qualified, ignored and even denied.

Later reports on the Protection of the Constitution do not mention the organisation anymore. Some state reports, such as from Baden-Württemberg and Bavaria, do still mention them in their reports.
The Bavarian intelligence agency regards the VVN-BbA's use of the term "anti-fascism," as meaning not just the fight against right-wing extremism, but also to mean agitation against the democratic state and its institutions. In addition, it claims the fight against right-wing extremism is a pretence under which organization tries to influence the middle class and co-opt democrats for its goals against the democracy.

Notable members
  (b. 1924), spokesman, North Rhine-Westphalia and federal committee member
 Mumia Abu-Jamal (b. 1954), American journalist and civil rights activist, convicted for the murder of a police officer, honorary member
  (1909–1997), 1969–1973 chairman of the DKP and co-founder of the VVN
 Ulrike Bahr (b. 1964) German politician (SPD) and since 2013 MP in the German Bundestag
 Esther Bejarano (b. 1924), Auschwitz survivor, honorary board member
 Siegfried Bibo, longtime chairman of the VVN-VdA
 Karin Binder (b. 1957), member of the Bundestag, Die Linke
  (b. 1935), former diplomat and Stasi agent in the former East Germany
 Gerd Bornemann, "top of the ticket" candidate for the PDS, Landtag election 2003 in Lower Saxony
  (1906–1999), FDP politician
 Emil Carlebach (1914–2001), 1932 KPD, DKP, VVN steering committee
 Hans Coppi, Jr. (b. 1942), historian, chairman of the Berlin Landesverband
  (1924–2003), chairman of the East German IVVDN
  (b. 1953), electrician, member of Berlin parliament, and parliamentary manager for Die Linke in Berlin
   (b. 1934), professor of history, member of Bundestag from Thuringia, state spokesman for the VVN-BdA
  (1917–1979), FDP politician; 2nd mayor of Hamburg; withdrew in 1950
 Heinrich Fink (b. 1935), chairman of the VVN-BdA
  (b. 1928), evangelical-reformed pastor, peace activist
 Heinz Galinski (1912–1992), 2nd chairman (till 1948) of the VVN in Berlin
  (b. 1960), historian, unaffiliated (formerly SPD)
 Peter Gingold (1916–2006), 1932 Young Communist League of Germany, 1937 KPD, DKP), national spokesman of the VVN-BdA
 Kurt Julius Goldstein (1914–2007), honorary chairman of the VVN-BdA, KPDSED
 Eva Gottschaldt (b. 1953), historian, unaffiliated and Protestant Christian
 Carl Helfrich (1906–1960), first editor-in-chief of the VVN newspaper, Die Tat
 Willy Hundertmark (1906–2002), co-founder of the VVN and chairman of the state VVN, Bremen, 1983–1991 (afterward, honorary chairman), 1926 KPD, later DKP
 Margarete Jung (1898 — 1979), East German politician
 Walter Kaufmann (1924–2021), author
 Victor Klemperer (1881–1960), novelist
 Lorenz Knorr (1921–2018), (Deutsche Friedensunion), journalist
 Kerstin Köditz (b. 1967), member of Landtag, (Die Linke) in Saxony
 Martin Löwenberg (b. 1925), Flossenbürg concentration camp survivor
 Adolf Maislinger (1903–1985), KPD, Dachau resistance group
 Dorothée Menzner (b. 1965), member of Bundestag, Die Linke
 Josef Müller (politician) (1898–1979), representative in the Weimar Republic, first chairman of the CSU
 Harry Naujoks (1901–1983), chairman, international Sachsenhausen committee
 Werner Pfennig (1937–2008), chairman VVN-BdA, 2002–2008
 Karl Raddatz (1904–1970), general secretary of the VVN in the Soviet occupation zone und co-director of the interzone secretariat of the VVN
  (1902–1991), president of the VVN, 1962–1991
 Heinz Schröder (VVN) (1910–1997), longtime chairman of the VVN-VdA in West-Berlin
 Hans Schwarz (VVN), co-director of the inter-zone secretariat of the VVN
 Robert Siewert (1887–1973), first Minister of the Interior, GDR
 Walter Vielhauer (1909–1986) mayor of Heilbronn (KPD, later DKP)
 Maria Wachter (1910–2010), honorary chairman of the VVN-BdA in North Rhine-Westphalia
 Christel Wegner (b. 1947), DKP
 Heinrich Feisthauer (1898–1964), survivor of Sachsenhausen concentration camp

Sources
 Wolfgang Rudzio, Die Erosion der Abgrenzung. Zum Verhältnis zwischen der demokratischen Linken und Kommunisten in der Bundesrepublik Deutschland. Opladen 1988 (p. 111),  
 Elke Reuter and Detlef Hansel, Das kurze Leben der VVN von 1947 bis 1953: Die Geschichte der Verfolgten des Nazi-Regimes in der SBZ und DDR. Berlin 1997,  
 Kurt Faller and Bernd Wittich, Abschied vom Antifaschismus. Frankfurter (Oder) 1997,  
 Ulrich Schneider, Zukunftsentwurf Antifaschismus. 50 Jahre Wirken der VVN für „eine neue Welt des Friedens und der Freiheit“. Bonn 1997,  
 Bundesamt für Verfassungsschutz: „Vereinigung der Verfolgten des Naziregimes-Bund der Antifaschistinnen und Antifaschisten“ (VVN-BdA), Cologne, June 1997 
 Der Bundesminister des Innern (Publ.): Bedeutung und Funktion des Antifaschismus, Bonn 1990 
 Bettina Blank, "Vereinigung der Verfolgten des Naziregimes - Bund der Antifaschistinnen und Antifaschisten“ (VVN-BdA)" ''Jahrbuch Extremismus & Demokratie. 12, Baden-Baden 2000, pp. 224-239

Notes

References

External links

 Official website of the VVN-BdA 
 antifa (anti-fascist) Magazine VVN-BdA membership publication 
 Neofascism in Germany 

 History of the VVN
 "2007 – 60 Jahre VVN" ("60 Years of the VVN") Hans Coppi, Jr. and Nicole Warmbold on the founding of the VVN 
 Jan Foizik, SBZ Handbuch. (Soviet occupation zone handbook 1945-1949) 
 Sven Wierskalla,  Die Vereinigung der Verfolgten des Naziregimes (VVN) in der Sowjetischen Besatzungszone und in Berlin 1945 bis 1948 
 The history of the VVN in Hamburg 
 The history of the VVN in North Rhine-Westphalia 
 The story of "Victims of Fascism Day" 

1947 establishments in Germany
Anti-fascist organisations in Germany
Holocaust survivors
Political history of Germany
Political repression in Nazi Germany
Organisations based in Berlin